Tappeh Goleh or Tappeh Galleh, also rendered as Tappeh Gola or Tappeh Glaeh or Tappeh Gol or Tappeh-ye Gol,  may refer to:
 Tappeh Goleh-ye Olya
 Tappeh Goleh-ye Sofla